Axel Hayford Reed (13 March 1835 – 21 January 1917) was a captain in the United States Army who was awarded the Medal of Honor for gallantry during the American Civil War. During the battles at Chickamauga, Georgia and Missionary Ridge, Tennessee on 19 September and 15 November 1863, respectively, Reed voluntarily left his position in the rear of the army to engage the Confederates. He was later severely wounded while leading a charge against Confederate positions.

Personal life

Early life 
Reed was born on 13 March 1835 in Hartford, Oxford County, Maine to parents Sampson Reed (1799-1877) and Huldah Bisbee Reed (1803-1842), the youngest of 7 children. His mother died when he was 7. He stayed on his father's farm until the age of 19, when he left for Minnesota with 5 dollars. After working for several years at a brickmaker's in Glencoe, Minnesota, he was able to invest all of his savings into 160 acres of land.

After the war 
After the end of the Civil War, Reed married Nettie Hannah Morrison (1843-1931) in 1869 and fathered 4 children: Cora Lydia Reed (1871-1936), Nellie A. Reed (1873-1875), Axel H. Reed (1876-1937), and Frank E. Reed (1880-1967). He bought a mercantile and traded commodities. He also helped bring the first railroads to McLeod County and helped establish the First National Bank of Glencoe. He was also involved in the political affairs of Glencoe and McLeod County, serving as a representative to the Minnesota Legislature. Axel H. Reed died on 21 January 1917 in Glencoe, McLeod County, Minnesota and is buried in the Glencoe City Cemetery or the Mount Auburn Cemetery in Glencoe.

Military service 
Reed entered service on 16 August 1861 and served with Company K of the 2nd Minnesota Infantry Regiment. During the battles at Chickamauga, Georgia and Missionary Ridge, Tennessee on 19 September and 15 November 1863, respectively, Reed, then a Sergeant, voluntarily left his position in the rear of the army, where he had been arrested and interned for criticizing military food through the Nashville Union newspaper, to engage the Confederates with a rifle. After his lieutenant was wounded he took charge of his company. He was personally released from arrest by General George Henry Thomas after the end of the battle. He later lost an arm while leading a charge against Confederate positions, but refused to accept a discharge from the army and fought to stay in active service until the end of the war. For these actions, he was awarded the Medal of Honor on 2 April 1898. He was promoted to the rank of second lieutenant on 17 August 1864 and first lieutenant on 18 February 1865. He was mustered out of service at Fort Snelling on 18 July 1865.

His Medal of Honor citation reads,

References 

1835 births
1917 deaths
American Civil War recipients of the Medal of Honor
People from Hartford, Maine
Union Army officers